The Luppbode is a right-hand tributary of the Bode in the Harz mountains in the German state of Saxony-Anhalt.

Course 
The Luppbode rises south of Allrode and flows in a northerly direction. It continues as a lively, babbling brook, parallel to the L93 road. In spring, the Luppbode swells into a raging meltwater torrent in places. It is one of the few right-hand tributary streams that flow into the Bode in the area of the Bode Gorge. Its mouth is opposite the village of  Treseburg.

Fauna 
A large number of threatened animal species live in the Luppbode, such as the brown trout and small shellfish.

Tributaries 
 Steinbornsbach (left)
 Trockenbach (left)

See also 
List of rivers of Saxony-Anhalt

Rivers of Saxony-Anhalt
Rivers of the Harz
Rivers of Germany